Polyscias farinosa is a species of plant in the family Araliaceae. It is endemic to Ethiopia.

References

Flora of Ethiopia
farinosa
Near threatened plants
Taxonomy articles created by Polbot